The Xinhua Old Street is a street in Xinhua District, Tainan, Taiwan.

History
The street used to be an important business hub in the 1920s engaged in wholesale fruits business. In 1921, the west side of Zhongzheng Road underwent major construction and the east side followed soon afterwards. In 1937, some Japanese government officials ordered the whole buildings along the road to be renovated into Baroque style according to urban plan.

Architecture
Buildings along the street are foreign-style houses with Baroque-style architecture, which was the most modern style of buildings during the Japanese rule of Taiwan.

See also
 List of roads in Taiwan
 List of tourist attractions in Taiwan

References

Streets in Taiwan
Transportation in Tainan